Conomitra fusellina is an extinct species of sea snail, a marine gastropod mollusk, in the family Volutomitridae.

Distribution
Fossils of this marine species were found in Eocene strata in Loire-Atlantique, France.

References

 Blondeau (A.), Brébion (P.), Buge (E.), Chevalier (J.-P.), Damotte (R.), Lauriat-Rage (A.), Le Calvez (Y.), Roman (J.), Ters (M.) & Viaud (J.-M.), 1982 - Le Lutétien supérieur de Pierre-Aiguë près de Saint-Aignan-Grand-Lieu (Loire-Atlantique). Bulletin du Bureau de Recherches Géologiques et Minières, sér. 2, t. 1, vol. 1-2, p. 115-142
 Le Renard, J. & Pacaud, J. (1995). Révision des mollusques Paléogènes du Bassin de Paris. II. Liste des références primaires des espèces. Cossmanniana. 3: 65-132.

External links
 Lamarck [J.B.P.A. de. (1803). Suite des mémoires sur les fossiles des environs de Paris. Annales du Muséum d'Histoire Naturelle. 2: 57-63; 163-169; 217-227]

fusellina
Gastropods described in 1803